José Augusto Pinto de Almeida (born 13 April 1937), known as José Augusto, is a Portuguese retired footballer who played as a winger, and a coach.

He played most of his career with Benfica, for which he appeared in 369 competitive matches and scored 174 goals, winning 13 major titles including eight Primeira Liga championships and two European Cups. He was dubbed the "Portuguese Garrincha" by Gabriel Hanot.

A Portuguese international over one full decade, José Augusto represented the nation at the 1966 World Cup. He later worked as a manager, for more than 30 years.

Club career
Born in Barreiro, Setúbal District, José Augusto started playing with local F.C. Barreirense, spending four seasons in the Primeira Liga there. In summer 1959 he joined S.L. Benfica, going on to be part of the club's legendary attacking unit that also included Mário Coluna, Eusébio, António Simões and José Torres. He and his teammates won two European Cups, in 1961 and 1962, and still reached a further three finals in the decade; in the 1960–61 domestic league season he scored a career-best 24 goals in only 25 games, helping the side to the title.

José Augusto retired early into the 1969–70 campaign at the age of 32, immediately being named Benfica's head coach and leading them to the second position behind Sporting CP. He subsequently worked with several teams, including S.C. Farense and F.C. Penafiel in the top level.

In 1994–95, in what was his first experience abroad, José Augusto was one of five managers in charge of CD Logroñés, as the club was relegated from La Liga with an all-time low 13 points.

International career
José Augusto made his debut for Portugal on 7 May 1958, in a 1–2 friendly loss with England. He took part in a further 44 internationals over one full decade, and scored nine goals.

José Augusto was selected for the 1966 FIFA World Cup squad. He played all the games and netted three times through headers for the eventual third-placed team, twice against Hungary in the opener (3–1, the first in the first minute) and once against North Korea in the quarter-finals (5–3).

As a manager, José Augusto had a two-year spell with the national side, leading them to the runner-up position in the Brazil Independence Cup and through the unsuccessful 1974 World Cup qualifying campaign. In the 80s he was in charge of the youth teams, helping develop Carlos Queiroz; additionally, he was an assistant in the UEFA Euro 1984 finals in France.

From 2004 to 2007, José August coached the women's national team.

Career statistics

|}

Honours

Player
Benfica
Primeira Liga (8): 1959–60, 1960–61, 1962–63, 1963–64, 1964–65, 1966–67, 1967–68, 1968–69
Taça de Portugal: 1961–62, 1963–64, 1968–69
Taça de Honra
European Cup: 1960–61, 1961–62
Intercontinental Cup runner-up: 1961, 1962

Portugal
FIFA World Cup third place: 1966

Manager
Benfica
Taça de Portugal: 1969–70

Portugal
Brazil Independence Cup runner-up

Individual
World Soccer World XI: 1964, 1965

References

External links

1937 births
Living people
Sportspeople from Barreiro, Portugal
Portuguese footballers
Association football wingers
Primeira Liga players
F.C. Barreirense players
S.L. Benfica footballers
UEFA Champions League winning players
Portugal international footballers
1966 FIFA World Cup players
Portuguese football managers
Primeira Liga managers
Liga Portugal 2 managers
S.L. Benfica managers
Vitória F.C. managers
Portimonense S.C. managers
S.C. Farense managers
F.C. Penafiel managers
La Liga managers
CD Logroñés managers
Fath Union Sport managers
Portugal national football team managers
Portuguese expatriate football managers
Expatriate football managers in Spain
Expatriate football managers in Morocco
Portuguese expatriate sportspeople in Spain
Portuguese expatriate sportspeople in Morocco